is a Tōkyū Tōyoko Line station located in Meguro Ward, Tōkyō.

Station layout
This elevated station consists of two opposite side platforms serving two tracks. This local station can only accommodate 8-car length trains.

History 
Toritsu-Daigaku Station opened on 28 August 1927 as Kakinokizaka Station. It gained its current name in 1952.

References

Tokyu Toyoko Line
Stations of Tokyu Corporation
Railway stations in Tokyo